Goldenhill Wanderers F.C. was an English association football club, from Goldenhill, near Stoke-on-Trent, Staffordshire.

History
The club was founded in 1875 under the name Goldenhill and competed in the English FA Cup during the 1880s.  In the club's early days, the media occasionally referred to the team as Golden Hill.  From around 1895 the club is variously referred to as Goldenhill or Goldenhill Wanderers and by 1900 the name Goldenhill Wanderers is established.  The club participated in the Staffordshire Senior Cup from 1878; in its first match in the competition, the club lost to Stoke.  Despite the presence in the competition in the 1880s of a number of teams that would eventually join the Football League (as far south as West Bromwich Albion), the village club once reached the semi-finals.

FA Cup

Goldenhill's first FA Cup entry was in 1884-85 and the club lost in the first round to Wrexham Olympic to a last-minute goal,   which Goldenhill alleged was scored directly from a corner, and therefore, under the laws at the time, illegitimate.

The club's next two entries into the competition were full of controversy.  In the first round in 1885-86, the team was drawn to play Davenham, at the latter's home ground; Goldenhill walked off when the referee awarded a goal to Davenham just before half-time when Goldenhill thought they should have had a throw-in.  The referee recorded the final score as being 3-1.

In 1886-87, the club's first round tie with Macclesfield generated even more controversy.  Macclesfield did not turn up on time, so Goldenhill kicked off and claimed the match; when Macclesfield did turn up, the Cheshire club protested the size and state of the pitch; near the end of the 90 minutes, with the score 4-2 to Goldenhill, the Silkmen walked off the pitch in protest at the rough play of Goldenhill.  The FA upheld Macclesfield's protests and ordered a replay, which took place at Westwood Lane, the home ground of Leek.  The game ended 2-2 and the teams agreed to play an extra half-an-hour, in which Goldenhill scored a winning goal.

In the second round, the club played at Chester and lost 1-0 in front of a crowd of 1,000.  However Goldenhill protested that the Cestrians had played four ineligible players.  The FA found that Chester had registered the players 2 days before the match, which was too late for them to be eligible to play,  so FA upheld the protest, putting Goldenhill into the third round, where they were drawn to play Chirk A.A.A.  The match never took place as Chester had put in a counter-protest regarding two of Goldenhill's players, which the FA considered at a later date, and also upheld, which gave Chirk a walkover into the fourth round.

The club did not enter the FA Cup again, and, surrounded by professional teams, retreated to the junior ranks.

Leagues

The club was a member of various Staffordshire leagues (including the North Staffordshire District in the 1890s), and, after falling into abeyance in 2006 was revived in 2014, but did not survive into the 2018-19 season.

Colours

The club played in amber and black stripes in the 1880s, with either white or navy knickerbockers.  In the 20th century the club generally wore blue shirts and white shorts.

Records

Best FA Cup performance: 2nd or 3rd round, 1886-87

Staffordshire FA Senior Vase winners, 1982-83

Notable players

Tommy Clare, England international and Stoke's first professional footballer

James Bradley, League title winner with Liverpool

Bob Whittingham, future Stoke and Chelsea player

Alan Dodd, future Stoke player

Peter Coates, bet365 owner

References

Defunct football clubs in England
Defunct football clubs in Staffordshire
1875 establishments in England
Association football clubs established in 1875
Association football clubs disestablished in 2018
2018 disestablishments in England